Bounty Hunters is a 2016 action comedy-drama film directed by Shin Terra and starring Lee Min-ho, Wallace Chung, Tiffany Tang, Jeremy Tsui, Karena Ng and Louis Fan. A Chinese-South Korean-Hong Kong co-production, the film was released in China by Le Vision Pictures on July 1, 2016.

Plot
Martial arts expert Lee San and master sleuth Ayo were working as bodyguards-for-hire, but to little success. However, they were dismissed by Interpol officers a year ago. When a vague commission leads them to a hotel room in Incheon, South Korea, a terrorist bombing duly takes place and turns the bumbling investigators into fugitives. Their informant dies, but the pair also immediately find themselves pursued by a rival group of bounty hunters. After an exhilarating car chase, San and Yo join forces with a trio: Bossy heiress Kat on an anti-terrorist mission since her lost childhood Swan, who is the resident hacker and maker of fantastic gadgets, and the muscled Bao Bao. To clear their names, they must work with the trio to track down the culprit of a series of bombings that have plagued an international hotel group. After many hurdles, they manage to capture the bombers and the duo are proven innocent.

Cast
Lee Min-ho as Lee San
Wallace Chung as Ayo
Tiffany Tang as Kat
Jeremy Jones Xu as Tommy
Karena Ng as Swan
Louis Fan as Bao Bao

Reception
The film has grossed .

References

External links

Chinese action comedy films
2010s Korean-language films
Films set in Tokyo
Films set in Hong Kong
Films set in Bangkok
Films set in South Korea
Films shot in Thailand
Films shot in China
Films shot in South Korea
2016 action comedy films
Le Vision Pictures films
South Korean comedy-drama films
Hong Kong comedy-drama films
Films directed by Shin Tae-ra
2016 comedy films
2010s Mandarin-language films
2010s Hong Kong films
2010s South Korean films